Emircan Koşut (born 3 July 1995) is a Turkish professional basketball player for Türk Telekom of the Turkish Basketbol Süper Ligi (BSL). He plays at the center and power forward positions.

Professional career

Early years
Koşut was born in Gaziosmanpaşa, Istanbul. He started playing basketball in Bayrampaşa Sancak team when he was ten. In 2011, he moved to the Anadolu Efes junior team.

Anadolu Efes
In the first year, he played for the junior and youth teams of Efes. He was loaned for the 2012–13 season to TB2L team Pertevniyal which is the pilot club of Anadolu Efes. In the summer of 2014, Koşut moved to Anadolu Efes first team. He was released from the team on 20 June 2016.

Individual Awards
2015 FIBA Europe Under-20 Championship: All-Tournament Team

References

External links
 Emircan Koşut at Anadolu Efes Official Web Site
 Emircan Koşut at draftexpress.com
 Emircan Koşut at eurobasket.com
 Emircan Koşut at euroleague.net
 Emircan Kosut at fiba.com
 Emircan Koşut at tblstat.net

1995 births
Living people
Anadolu Efes S.K. players
Centers (basketball)
Darüşşafaka Basketbol players
Merkezefendi Belediyesi Denizli Basket players
Basketball players from Istanbul
Turkish men's basketball players
Yeşilgiresun Belediye players